Mike Pinera (born September 29, 1948) is an American guitarist, singer, songwriter and producer who started professionally in the late 1960s with the group Blues Image, which had a number 4 hit in 1970 with their song "Ride Captain Ride". After the break-up of that group, he joined Iron Butterfly, and later formed the group Ramatam. Pinera was then the founding member of the band New Cactus, a later incarnation of the band Cactus.  He was the lead guitarist for Alice Cooper from 1980 to 1982. He is currently performing with his solo band and The Classic Rock All-Stars.

Career

Early years
Mike Pinera and his group Blues Image were co-founders and house band at Thee Image, a Miami Beach concert venue they opened and co-headlined on weekends, playing with such groups as Cream, Grateful Dead, The Yardbirds, The Animals, Frank Zappa and many more. Blues Image soon signed with Atlantic Records where they scored the major hit "Ride Captain Ride" (1970), which Pinera co-wrote and sang. 

Pinera joined Iron Butterfly in 1970,  and recorded the album  Metamorphosis.  He was one of the first guitarists to use the "Guitar Talk Box" which is featured on the song "Butterfly Bleu", which was written by Pinera. The album reached the top 20 and has achieved multi-platinum status.

In 1972, Pinera and Jimi Hendrix's drummer Mitch Mitchell formed the band Ramatam on Atlantic Records,  and was produced by Tom Dowd, who was quoted as saying this album was one of his all time favorites.

In 1973, Pinera helped formed The New Cactus Band.  They recorded the album, Son of Cactus, on Atlantic Records. In 1975, he formed the band Thee Image and they recorded two albums on Manticore Records,  Thee Image and Inside the Triangle, both produced by Pinera.

Solo career
In 1977, Pinera's first solo album, Isla, was released on Capricorn Records.  It was followed by Forever in 1979 on Capitol Records.  The songs were written and produced by Pinera. The Forever album contained the single "Goodnight My Love," which spent eight weeks on the Billboard Hot 100, peaking at number 70 in February 1980. It was also a hit in Latin America featured in Tele-Novelas Latin TV Series. Pinera joined the Alice Cooper band and he played in the band from the late 1970s to the early 1980s.

References

External links
 

1948 births
Living people
American rock musicians
Musicians from Tampa, Florida
Iron Butterfly members
Alice Cooper (band) members
Blues Image members
Cactus (American band) members